Nathan Robinson (born December 31, 1981) is a Canadian former ice hockey forward. He played 7 games in the National Hockey League with the Detroit Red Wings and Boston Bruins between 2003 and 2006. The rest of his career, which lasted from 2002 to 2020, was primarily been spent in Europe.

Playing career

Robinson played major junior hockey with the Belleville Bulls of the Ontario Hockey League, where he won the OHL scoring title in the 2001-02 season. He was passed over in the NHL Entry Draft but signed with the Detroit Red Wings as a free agent on October 15, 2002.  He made his NHL debut with the Red Wings during the 2003–04 NHL season, playing five games in all, going scoreless.  After three years within the Red Wings organization on August 15, 2005, he signed with the Boston Bruins and over the course of the 2005–06 season played two more games in the NHL but again went pointless receiving very little playing time to prove his potential.

In 2006, he left for Europe signing with Adler Mannheim in Germany and then moved to Eisbären Berlin the next season becoming an elite player in the Deutsche Eishockey Liga. Prior to the 2009–10 season he signed a two-year contract to return with Adler Mannheim. In his first season in his return to Mannheim, Robinson helped the Eagles become DEL Champions, marking his third successive DEL Championship.

During the 2010–11 season, in his final year of his deal with Mannheim, Robinson struggled to maintain his previous form and was subsequently released to join eventual silver medalists Espoo Blues of the Finnish SM-liiga, for the remainder of the season finishing on January 27, 2011. In September 2011, he signed a contract with the Vienna Capitals of the Austrian Hockey League.

On September 5, 2012, he signed a one-year contract as a free agent in Germany with the Kölner Haie of the DEL.

On July 28, 2014, Robinson was announced as signing a short term deal with the Nottingham Panthers of the UK's EIHL who, for the first time in their history, are to compete in the Champions Hockey League in 2014/15. He had to leave the club in November 2014 as his work permit expired. Robinson then signed with the Belfast Giants of the EIHL.

Following the 2014-15 season, Robinson signed with HC Slavia Praha of the 1st Czech Republic Hockey League, a second level ice hockey league in the Czech Republic. For the 2016-17 season, Robinson signed with Shakhtyor Soligorsk of the Belarusian Extraliga, and later signed with EHC Bayreuth in the DEL2. Despite originally signing with HC 07 Detva in the Slovak Extraliga, Robinson switched to the Saale Bulls Halle in the German league Oberliga for the 2017-18 season after playing 4 games.

Career statistics

Regular season and playoffs

See also
List of black NHL players

References

External links

1981 births
Living people
Adler Mannheim players
EHC Bayreuth players
Belfast Giants players
Belleville Bulls players
Black Canadian ice hockey players
Boston Bruins players
Canadian expatriate ice hockey players in Austria
Canadian expatriate ice hockey players in England
Canadian expatriate ice hockey players in Finland
Canadian expatriate ice hockey players in Germany
Canadian ice hockey left wingers
Detroit Red Wings players
Eisbären Berlin players
Espoo Blues players
Grand Rapids Griffins players
HC 07 Detva players
HC Shakhtyor Soligorsk players
HC Slavia Praha players
Kölner Haie players
Nottingham Panthers players
Providence Bruins players
Saale Bulls Halle players
Sportspeople from Scarborough, Toronto
Ice hockey people from Toronto
Syracuse Crunch players
Toledo Storm players
Undrafted National Hockey League players
Vienna Capitals players
Canadian expatriate ice hockey players in Northern Ireland
Canadian expatriate ice hockey players in Belarus
Canadian expatriate ice hockey players in the Czech Republic
Canadian expatriate ice hockey players in Slovakia
Canadian expatriate ice hockey players in the United States